Woodford was a local government district in the county of Essex, England from 1873 to 1934, corresponding to the London suburb of Woodford.

The parish of Woodford St Mary adopted the Local Government Act 1858 in 1873, setting up a local board of nine members. The Local Government Act 1894 reconstituted its area as an urban district, governed by an urban district council. St Mary's church is a thriving Anglican parish  today.

It was amalgamated with Wanstead Urban District in 1934 to form Wanstead and Woodford Urban District and now forms the northwestern part of the London Borough of Redbridge in Greater London.

References

History of the London Borough of Redbridge
Districts of England created by the Local Government Act 1894
History of local government in London (1889–1965)
Urban districts of England